HMS Ulysses was a U-class destroyer of the British Royal Navy that saw service during World War II. She was later converted into a Type 15 fast anti-submarine frigate, with the new pennant number F17.

Service history

Second World War service

On commissioning Ulysses was allocated to the 25th Destroyer Flotilla and worked as part of the Home Fleet; this included work on the Arctic convoys. In June 1944 she assisted with the invasion of Normandy, providing naval gunfire support. In late 1944 and early 1945 she was refitted for service in the Far East and in March 1945 left the UK to join the British Pacific Fleet.  She returned to the UK in 1946 and was soon placed in reserve.

Postwar service
Between 1946 and 1951 Ulysses was held in reserve at Devonport. In December 1951 she was commissioned for the Plymouth local flotilla. In 1953 she was again reduced to the reserve at Devonport. Between 1954 and 1955 she was converted to a Type 15 anti-submarine frigate, at Devonport Dockyard.

On 18 October 1955 she re-commissioned and formed part of the 6th Frigate Squadron, as part Mediterranean and Home Fleet. She also formed part of the Royal Navy's force used during the Suez Operation. In 1958 she was part of Operation Grapple, witnessing nuclear tests off Christmas Island. In 1960 she became a training ship as part of the Plymouth local squadron and in December 1960 was placed into the Devonport reserve.

Decommissioning and disposal
Ulysses was decommissioned in 1963 and in 1966 was still listed as in reserve. She was scrapped at Plymouth in 1970.

Notes

Publications
 
 
 
 
 
 

U and V-class destroyers of the Royal Navy
Ships built on the River Mersey
1943 ships
World War II destroyers of the United Kingdom
Cold War destroyers of the United Kingdom
Type 15 frigates
Cold War frigates of the United Kingdom